SS Tuxpam can refer to

 , a banana boat built in 1915 and named Tuxpam 1934–38
 , a dredger built as SS Empire Clydesdale in 1944 and named Tuxpam 1946–70

Ship names